Euclidia ardita is a moth of the family Erebidae. It is found from British Columbia south to California.

The wingspan is about 32 mm.

References

External links
Bug Guide
Images

Moths of North America
Moths described in 1957
Euclidia